The Principal Private Secretary to the Prime Minister of the United Kingdom is a senior official in the United Kingdom Civil Service who acts as principal private secretary to the prime minister of the United Kingdom. The holder of this office is traditionally the head of the Prime Minister's Office in 10 Downing Street. In the Civil Service, the role is currently graded as director general. 

The current principal private secretary is Elizabeth Perelman, who assumed the position following the appointment of Rishi Sunak as Prime Minister on 25 October 2022.

Recent history 
During Tony Blair's administration, the prime minister (as Minister for the Civil Service) modified the law under which the Civil Service operated (through an Order in Council) which gave power to the newly created the role of Downing Street Chief of Staff (a politically appointed special adviser) to give instructions to civil servants and outranked the principal private secretary in the Downing Street power structure. When Gordon Brown entered 10 Downing Street, he reversed the change to the Civil Service law.

When David Cameron became prime minister, he promoted his then principal private secretary to a new post of "permanent secretary, Downing Street"; a position which took over as the top civil servant in the Prime Minister's Office and for the first time the head of the office held the highest rank in the UK's civil service. In 2012, when the post-holder, Jeremy Heywood, was appointed Cabinet Secretary; this new post ceased to exist, and the chief Civil Service official in 10 Downing Street reverted to being the Principal Private Secretary, which remains to this day.

The principal secretary runs the private office of the prime minister, which includes the Private Secretary for Foreign Affairs to the Prime Minister.

List of principal private secretaries to the prime minister (from 1757, incomplete)

See also 

 Prime Minister's Office
Principal Private Secretary to the Secretary of State for Foreign and Commonwealth Affairs

References 

British Prime Minister's Office
Civil service positions in the United Kingdom
Lists of British people